The Korail Class 8000 locomotive is a series of South Korean electric locomotives operated by Korail. This locomotive was introduced from 1972 to 1990, after electrification of several industrial lines. It was assigned both passenger and freight duty until the introduction of the 8200 series, which restricted the older locomotives to solely freight service. 94 were built (numbered 8001-8094), but many have been retired as new replacements enter service.

Technical details 
The locomotive was designed by the 50 C/s Group, which consisted of European manufacturers Alsthom (now Alstom), Siemens, MTE, Brown-Boveri, ACEC, and AEG, and was led by Alsthom. The locomotive has three bogies in Bo-Bo-Bo arrangement. The gear ratio is 15:96, and top speed , optimized for mountain lines with steep grades and short radius curves.
The design was inspired by contemporary French locomotives, such as SNCF Class BB 15000 and SNCF Class CC 6500.

Accidents 
On November 3, 1975, units 8056 and 8058 fell off the Seonam bridge, on the Taebaek Line. 8056 was refurbished in KNR Seoul Factory in January 1977, 8058 was rebuilt by Hanjin Heavy Industry in January 1979.

Retirement 
As the Class 8000 locomotives neared the end of their 30-year lifespans, Korail found the need to order replacement locomotives. The replacements came to be known as the Korail 8500 locomotives, and have been steadily entering service since 2012. The majority of the Class 8000 locomotives have been retired by the new Class 8500 locomotives; only units 8091-8094 remain in service up to this day (from the entire order of 8001-8094).

Units 8001 and 8091 are expected to be preserved at this time. They are currently stored out of service.

References

Bibliography 

 

Bo-Bo-Bo locomotives
Electric locomotives of South Koreaㅕㅗㅓ이모 누차유자
Railway locomotives introduced in 1972
25 kV AC locomotives
50 c/s Group locomotives
Standard gauge locomotives of South Korea

ㅗㅗㅎㅊ츄ㅓ.,ㅓㅗ훠ㅓㅜ,ㅏㅜㅍ 지하가 엄마 엄마 내 눈은 하세요 아빠 이거 뭐야 아는 아니야